"Every Other Time" is a song by American pop band LFO. It was released on May 29, 2001, as the first single of their final album, Life Is Good (2001). The song contains a sampling from KC and the Sunshine Band's "That's the Way (I Like It)". The song reached number 44 on US Billboard Hot 100, number 24 on UK Singles Chart and number 18 on New Zealand Singles Chart.

Critical reception
Chuck Taylor of Billboard magazine reviewed the song favorably, saying that it "shapes its personality around the elements of a traditional live band: guitars, bass, percussion." He goes on to say that this track demonstrates "evolution, maintaining a clever chorus and some memorable instrumental hooks but, thankfully, shedding the gimmicky sing-song elements of those previous radio staples."

Track listings

US 7-inch single
A. "Every Other Time"
B. "Life Is Good"

UK CD single
 "Every Other Time" – 4:07
 "Erase Her" – 4:25
 "Every Other Time" (video)
 Lyrics and album sampler

European CD single
 "Every Other Time" – 3:55
 "Erase Her" – 4:27
 "Summer Girls" – 4:17
 "Every Other Time" (video)

Charts

Release history

References

2001 singles
2001 songs
J Records singles
LFO (American band) songs
Music videos directed by Marcus Raboy
Songs written by Kenny Gioia
Songs written by Rich Cronin
Songs written by Shep Goodman